Maeve Kinkead (born May 31, 1946) is an American soap opera actress, writer and poet.

Acting 
After numerous roles on stage, Kinkead's first major role was as Angie Perrini on the soap Another World (1975–80).

Kinkead's longest running role was as Vanessa Chamberlain on the soap opera Guiding Light. She played the role on a contract basis from June 2, 1980 to August 28, 1981, February 1, 1982  to September 1996, and April 1997 to September 5, 2000. She garnered five Daytime Emmy nominations during her time on the show, winning for Outstanding Supporting Actress in 1992. In 1993, she received her first nomination as Outstanding Lead Actress.

In 2000, Kinkead left Guiding Light. She made special guest appearances as Vanessa in 2002 for Guiding Light's 65th anniversary on-screen. In 2005, Kinkead returned, and was included in the 70th anniversary cast photo. Kinkead appeared as Vanessa until the series finale on September 18, 2009. She garnered five Daytime Emmy nominations during her time on the show, winning for Outstanding Supporting Actress in 1992. In 1993, she received her first nomination as Outstanding Lead Actress.

Vanessa was a popular, central character; her rivalry with Nola Reardon (Lisa Brown), the wife of her brother Quint (Michael Tylo) was a popular story line. Memorable scenes from this story line included a public fight at the Civil War-themed Antebellum Ball, in which Vanessa and Nola showed up in the same dress. Vanessa later married Billy Lewis, and was entangled with the Spaulding family, at times working at Spaulding Enterprises. In later years, Vanessa renewed her rivalry with Nola when she married Nola's nephew Matt Reardon (Kurt McKinney). She and Ross also reunited with Dinah, the daughter Vanessa gave up for adoption.

Other work 
In 2008, Kinkead graduated from the Warren Wilson College Master of Fine Arts Program for Writers with a degree in poetry. She released her first book of poetry, A Dangling House, in 2017.

Personal life
Kinkead was born in New York City, where she lives with her husband Harry Streep, brother of Oscar-winning actress Meryl Streep, and their children.

Kinkead was diagnosed with breast cancer (time frame unknown). In 2006, she appeared on the PBS program The New Medicine, hosted by Dana Reeve, in a segment that discussed the comfort level patients have when they are interacting with physicians, and how empowered they feel about talking to their physicians about health concerns.

References

External links

1946 births
American soap opera actresses
Living people
Actresses from New York City
Daytime Emmy Award winners
Daytime Emmy Award for Outstanding Supporting Actress in a Drama Series winners
Radcliffe College alumni
21st-century American women